Uusimaa was a gunboat that served in the Finnish Navy during World War II. She was built in 1917. As the ship had changed hands many times during the turbulent last years of World War I she had been renamed many times: In Russian service, she was called Golub, later, in German service, her name was Beo. Finally the Germans handed her over to the Finns in 1920, who renamed her Uusimaa. After World War II, she served as a trawler in the Baltic Sea. She was scrapped in 1953.

Interwar period
On 4 September 1939, Uusimaa sailed as part of the Finnish Coastal Fleet to the vicinity of Åland and later patrolled the northern Baltic Sea and the Sea of Åland together with her sister ship .

Winter War

Uusimaa escorted minelayer  on 1 December 1939 when she laid mines to the seaways near Kökar and Utö. When following minelaying attempt on 3 December by Louhi failed and the minelayer was damaged Uusimaa laid part of the mines on 4 December.
Hämeenmaa and Uusimaa were detached from the Coastal Fleet on 6 January 1940 to provide escorts for shipping in the Gulf of Bothnia after several submarine sightings had been made north of Åland.

Continuation War

See also
 , sister ship

Citations

Bibliography
 
 
 

World War II patrol vessels of Finland
Patrol vessels of the Finnish Navy